Protocol Entertainment is a Canadian television production company that was founded in 1993. It is based in Toronto, Ontario.

Films and series 
 Animorphs
 Code Name: Eternity
 Dinner Along the Amazon
 Goosebumps
 Mama's Boy
 Metropia
 Pocahontas: The Legend
 Police Academy: The Series
 The Saddle Club
 Spenser for Hire: The Judas Goat
 Spenser for Hire: The Savage Place
 Train 48
 Young Heroes: Seeing-Fingers-The Louis

External links 
 Official website

Television production companies of Canada
Mass media companies established in 1993
Film production companies of Canada